Muskegon Correctional Facility (MCF) is a prison of the Michigan Department of Corrections located in Muskegon, Michigan. The prison opened in 1974. Additional housing units opened since then to accommodate more prisoners.

In 2010 the state of Michigan shut the prison down for two weeks to prepare for an arrival of prisoners from Pennsylvania. Pennsylvania had a contract with Michigan to house state prisoners in MCF, in order to alleviate overcrowding in the Pennsylvania Department of Corrections. Over 1,100 Pennsylvania prisoners were housed at MCF. The John S. Hausman of the Muskegon Chronicle said that the Pennsylvania contract was expected to be about four or five years long.

After the opening of additional state prisons in Pennsylvania was imminent, Pennsylvania withdrew its prisoners from MCF in 2011. Beginning in late April 2011, one group of about 240 prisoners was moved out of MCF each week. Wednesday, May 25, 2011 was the final day of operations, and the final "ride-out" of 239 Pennsylvania prisoners occurred on that day.

After the 2011 shutdown, 200 job positions ended. Most employees of MCF accepted vacant positions in the prison system or took jobs that were held by other prison system employees with less seniority.

The facility reopened in October 2012.

See also

 List of Michigan state prisons

References

External links
 

Prisons in Michigan
1974 establishments in Michigan
Buildings and structures in Muskegon, Michigan